Moments (Chinese: 朋友圈 pinyin: péngyǒu quān) is a function of the smartphone app WeChat, launched on 19 April 2012 in the WeChat version 4.0. It serves new social-networking functions for Wechat users. The Chinese translation of Moment is known as “Friends' circle”, which means users can share and get access to accepted WeChat friends' information, creating an intimate and private communicating circle within the users' choice of close friends.
	
Moments mainly focuses on sharing pictures with captions, while sharing statuses and sharing websites are also permitted.

History

On 19 April 2012, Moments was initially launched.(WeChat 4.0)
	
On 22 August 2012, Moments was updated with the new feature of comments to selected friends.(WeChat 4.2)
	
In September 2012, whether to receive the updating of friends and make private photos public could be decided by users.(WeChat 4.3)
	
On 7:30 22 July 2013, it was widely complained that Moments could not be refreshed.
	
In March 2014, users could attach location of restaurants or scenic.(WeChat 5.21)
	
On 19 May 2014, creating location information was available in Moments.(WeChat 5.3)
	
On 6 November 2014, Moments allowed the shoot and post of small videos.(WeChat 6.0.1 for iOS, the same for Android on 24 December 2014)
 	
On 20 January 2015, searching within Moments and booing towards the posts were allowed.(WeChat 6.1 for iOS, the same for Android on 9 February 2015)

On 18 May 2017, the ability to synchronize Moments posts with Facebook and Twitter was added to the iOS version of Moments

Features

Being semi-closed is the most significant feature of Moments. After registering a WeChat account, users can add other WeChat users as "friends" and "like" or "comment" on friends’ posts freely. However, different from other social-networking sites or applications, Moments follows the principle of "my friend's friend is not my friend". That is to say, a user can only see those likes and comments made by conjunct friends between the user and the author, while cannot see the expressions made by people beyond their friend lists. Except this general principle, individual setting for blocking certain friends from seeing owners' posts can be made by users.
	
Strict censorship is another feature of Moments. On Dec 12, 2014, WeChat announced that according to "related regulations,"domains of the web pages that want to get shared in WeChat Moments need to get an ICP license by Dec 31, 2014 to avoid being restricted by WeChat.<

Derived Cultures

According to the On Device Research, WeChat has 93% market penetration in mainland China. Its giant user group and mode of “content proceeding from relationship”enables the development of particular culture in Moments, which can be summarized as “circle culture”. “Circle culture” can further include some specific cultures such as the culture of sharing and“like” and the culture of grouping.

Circle culture

Moments has strict verification for participants, which makes one's virtual social circle more intimate and tightly formed, and more integrated into real-life social circle. Only mutual friends can set up communication in one circle, which indicates the high reciprocity and exclusivity among acquaintances. Moments accords with the Chinese-style interpersonal structure, which was described as the ripples generating circle by circle when a stone is thrown into water and everyone is in the center of a series of circles. The ties get weaker as the circles spread further.
	
Moments mainly consolidates strong ties and is supplemented with weak ties, and it functions in three hierarchies of a pyramid structure, from bottom to top.

The culture of sharing and “like”

The “sharing” function in Moments is of simple operation that it only needs a click on a button. Participants of Moments take pleasure in sharing and being shared possibly out of curiosity and vanity, enhancing the popularity of integrating the function “sharing to Moments” into many other applications or websites. What are frequently shared include selfies, cuisines, travel scenery, essays, propaganda, notices and even rumors. Getting “like”s is another desire among participants. The culture of “like” in Moments suggests a means of pursuing and highlighting one's existence and indicates the rule of interaction among members in a circle. A “like” conveys a strong emotional expression of one's stand and has a social and dissemination function to some extent.

The culture of grouping

Grouping is a way of dividing social circle, constructing and presenting one's self-image in different dimensions, to different audiences. People can decide in every single sharing that who can see while others not, and all these will be kept to themselves. Grouping provides some people with the opportunity of living in parallel space-time, the right of gaining admiration and the possibility of escapism.

Positive Impacts

Modern Instant Messaging systems in respect to privacy. All the comments and likes on a certain post could only be seen by users’ mutual friends. The personal originally sharing cannot be shared when directed to other groups of people.
Gave rise to new popular forms of information spreading for commercial, educational or other purposes. Since Moments is a more private space for information sharing, the messages on Moments are generally considered to be more credible.
Helps users keep in touch with acquaintances, and to some extent strengthens the users's relationships with acquaintances.
Low-cost and low-carbon way of recording personal lives. The installation of the application WeChat itself and the usage of basic functions including Moments is free. The potential space of storing posts is infinite, allowing for a large amount to be shared and saved over time.
Effective way of sharing personal feelings among groups of people. As long as the user has a device connected to the Internet, they can upload. Meanwhile, other users can check their friends’ posts at any time.

Negative Impacts

Spreading of false information
 	
As a social platform, Moments contains risks of misinformation, for example, "Ten secrets about Bo Xilai", "drinking milk leads to cancer". False information also spreads rapidly through reposts and sharing websites. Since most Moments friends are acquaintances, messages delivered by them can seem more convincing. Such false information misleads the public as well as causes negative social influence, even panic.
 	
Viral Marketing
 	
Marketing becomes a problem because some users operate online stores by using their Wechat accounts. To advertise goods, viral marketing methods including utilizing acquaintances network and posting advertisements several times a day in Moments are widely used. However, the existence of commercial advertising impacts the pureness of Moments and annoy most of users. To reduce advertisements, users have to block their friend-traders, though which will hurt their relations. Also, due to the absence of relevant policies, quality and service of those goods can hardly be guaranteed.
 	
Barrage of information
	
Except false information and advertisements, inspirational articles and Chicken Soup for the Soul(心靈雞湯) style stories elicit repugnance as well. It is because that almost all those stories follow similar ideal patterns and express similar thoughts. At first, such stories can inspire readers, but after a while, it is proved as nothing but placebo. Furthermore, some of them even make up experience or dicta of great men to persuade others to believe in their themes.

See also
 Qzone
 Instagram
 Facebook
 Twitter
 Sina Weibo

External links
 WeChat Moments: Share what you love
 WeChat Sight: Point, Shoot, Share

References

WeChat
Social networking services